Simmias (Greek: Σιμμίας) may refer to:

Simmias of Thebes, follower of Socrates
Simmias of Macedon, general of Alexander the Great
Simmias of Rhodes, poet and grammarian (late 4th century BC)
Simmias of Syracuse, student of philosophy
Simmias (explorer), Ptolemaic explorer of Red Sea. (3rd century BC)